Kirovsky District is an administrative district (raion), one of the 10 raions of Novosibirsk, Russia. It is located on the left bank of the Ob River. The area of the district is 50,7 km2 (19,6 sq mi). Population: 186,408 (2018 Census).

History
Until 1930, the territory of the Kirovsky and Leninsky city districts was part of the Bugrinsky District of the Novosibirsk Okrug.

In 1930, it was decided to build large plants on the left bank of the Ob River and the railway line from the Tolmachyovo Station to the mines of Kuzbass.

October 20, 1930, Zaobsky District was formed.

December 2, 1934, Zaobsky District was renamed the Kirovsky District.

In December 1970, part of the Kirovsky City District became the Leninsky City District.

Architecture

Soviet architecture

Post-Soviet architecture

Parks

Bugrinskaya Roshcha
Bugrinskaya Roshcha is a park, established in 1971.

Sibiryakov-Gvardeitsev Square

Education

Educational institutions
 Department of Physical Education of the Novosibirsk State Pedagogical University
 Novosibirsk College of Printing and Information Technology
 Novosibirsk Industrial College

Libraries
 Astafyev Library
 Bulgakov Library
 Bunin Library
 Family Reading Library
 Grin Library
 Korolenko Library
 Magalif Family Reading Library
 Makarenko Central Rayon Library
 Nosov Library
 Novosibirsk Oblast Special Library for the Blind and Visually Impaired
 Paustovsky Library

Culture
 House of Culture named after Yefremov
 Raduga (house of culture)

Sports
 Iceberg Ice Complex
 Arena Discovery Tennis Club
 Flamingo Stadium
 Rosto Motodrome

Football
 Dribbling Football Section
 Junior Children's Football School
 Tsentr Children's Football Club

Shooting Sports
 Sports and shooting complex
 Volniye Strelki Bow-Crossbow Club

Combat Sport
 Azbuka Karate
 Dizel Boxing Club
 Children's Union of Karate
 Dinamex Karate Club
 Novosibirsk Aikido Center
 Novosibirsk City Federation of Kyokushinkai
 Sports section of sambo
 Taekwondo Sport Federation of Novosibirsk Oblast

Religion

Christianity
 Orthodox Church of the Holy New Martyrs and Confessors of Russia
 Orthodox Chapel of the Icon of Vladimir Mother of God
 Mother Teresa's orphanage
 Caritas of Diocese of Transfiguration
 Christian Evangelical Church
 Novosibirsk Christian Church is a local religious organization of evangelical Christians
 Church of Jesus Christ of Latter-day Saints

Economy

Companies
 Novosibirsk Cold Storage is an ice cream manufacturer and food storage complex. It was founded in 1960.
 Novosibirsk Tin Plant
 NPO ELSIB
 Orion Confectionery
 Sibelektroprivod
 Sibelectroterm
 Siblitmash
 Tyazhstankohydropress

Retail
The district hosts shopping centres of international, interregional and local retail companies: MEGA Family Shopping Centre (IKEA, Auchan, Leroy Merlin), Metro Cash and Carry, Lenta, Posuda Centre and others.

Crime
In 2021, the district ranked first in the number of grievous bodily harm (43 cases) and robberies (81 cases). Also that year, 2051 thefts (third place after Leninsky and Oktyabrsky districts) and 28 motor vehicle theft (also third place after Leninsky and Oktyabrsky) were committed here.

Transportation

Bus and trolleybuses

Tram

Railway
Chemskoy Station is located in the district.

Bridges
Bugrinsky Bridge is an automobile bridge over the Ob River, connecting the Kirovsky and Oktyabrsky districts.

Komsomolsky Railway Bridge is a bridge over the Ob River built in 1930–1931.

References